George and William may refer to:

G. W. & W. D. Hewitt, American architects
George and William Besler, sons of William George Besler, American businessmen who acquired assets for the Doble steam car
George Chaffey and William Chaffey, Canadian engineers
George Bent and William Bent, American traders and Civil War figures

See also
William George (disambiguation)
George William (disambiguation)